The 2014–15 Southern Miss Golden Eagles men's basketball team represented the University of Southern Mississippi during the 2014–15 NCAA Division I men's basketball season. The Golden Eagles, led by first year head coach Doc Sadler, played their home games at Reed Green Coliseum and were members of Conference USA. They finished the season 9–20, 4–14 in C-USA play to finish in 13th place. Due to violations committed under the previous coaching regime, the team were ineligible for postseason play  including the C-USA tournament.

In 2016, the NCAA vacated six wins due to participation of two ineligible players, who were suspended effective January 29, 2015.

Previous season
The Golden Eagles finished the season 29–7, 13–3 in C-USA play to finish in a four-way tie for the C-USA regular season championship. They advanced to the semifinals of the C-USA tournament where they lost to Louisiana Tech. They were invited to the National Invitation Tournament where they defeated Toledo and Missouri to advance to the quarterfinals where they lost to Minnesota.

Departures

Incoming Transfers

Recruiting class of 2014

Roster

Schedule

|-
!colspan=9 style="background:#F1C500; color:#000000;"| Exhibition

|-
!colspan=9 style="background:#F1C500; color:#000000;"| Regular season

References

Southern Miss Golden Eagles basketball seasons
Southern Miss